Bouilly-en-Gâtinais (literally Bouilly in Gâtinais) is a commune in the Loiret department in north-central France.

Population

See also
Communes of the Loiret department

References

Communes of Loiret